Maniesh Paul (born 3 August 1981) is an Indian television presenter, anchor, model, singer, actor and comedian in Bollywood. Starting his career as an RJ and VJ, he moved to acting before taking up stand-up comedy and hosting.

Early life and background
Paul was born and brought up in Delhi to a Punjabi family originally from Sialkot to Delhi, involved in the financial business. 
He did his schooling from Apeejay School, Sheikh Sarai New Delhi. After his schooling, he did his B.A. in Tourism from College of Vocational Studies, University of Delhi. then he lived with his grandmother in Chembur, Mumbai.

Career

Early career
Paul started his career in Delhi, as a host, compering cultural events in schools and colleges. later he shifted to Mumbai, where his first break was hosting Sunday Tango on Star Plus in 2002. He also remained a VJ with Zee Music, and a radio jockey with Radio City's morning drive time show Kasakai Mumbai.

Acting career
Later he entered channel Star One's Ghost Bana Dost to play the role of a ghost. Paul has acted in many serials such as Radhaa Ki Betiyaan Kuch Kar Dikhayengi on NDTV Imagine, Zindadil on ZeeNext, Ssshhhh...Phir Koi Hai on Star One, Wheel Ghar Ghar Mein and Kahani Shuru with Love Guru on Zee TV and Kuchh Cook Hota Hai on 9X. However, finding it unsatisfying, he quit daily soaps and was even out of work for eight months in 2008.

Though he had appeared in cameo roles such as in the Akshay Kumar and Katrina Kaif-starrer Tees Maar Khan (2010), Paul made his debut in a lead role of the computer geek Mickey in  Mickey Virus (2013) which received a lot of appreciation.

Television host and presenter
Subsequently, Paul started his career as a television host and presenter, and gained recognition after hosting Saa Ree Gaa Maa Paa Chhote Ustaad, and later also appeared in the stand-up comedy series Comedy Circus. He also hosted Dance India Dance Li'l Masters on Zee TV. He also participated in Star Ya Rockstar, a celebrity singing show on Zee TV, and co-hosted the celebrity dance-reality competition Jhalak Dikhhla Jaa 7 on Colors TV with Ranvir Shorey.
He was also the host of Science of Stupid (IND) version.

In 2011, Paul won the Best Anchor award for Zee TV's Dance India Dance Li'l Masters.

Paul has also hosted Science of Stupid on National Geographic. Over the years, Paul has hosted numerous award shows. In 2018, he hosted Sony TV's Indian Idol 10. Next, he hosted Star Plus's Nach Baliye 9.

Personal life

He is married to Sanyukta Paul (m. 2007), who is a Bengali. They met each other in their school and started dating in late 1998. Soon, their families got to know each other and they finally got married in 2007. They have a daughter born in 2011 and a son born in 2016.

Television

Filmography

Discography

Events and awards nights

References

External links

 Manish Paul at IMDb
 

Living people
Indian male television actors
People from Delhi
Indian television presenters
Delhi University alumni
Masters of ceremonies
Indian stand-up comedians
Participants in Indian reality television series
Punjabi people
Apeejay School alumni
Indian male comedians
1981 births